Aden B. Meinel (November 25, 1922 – October 3, 2011) was an American astronomer. He retired in 1993 as a distinguished scientist at the Jet Propulsion Laboratory. He also held the rank of professor emeritus at the University of Arizona College of Optical Sciences. His research interests have included upper atmospheric physics, glass technology, optical design, instrumentation and space systems.

Meinel received his Ph.D. from the University of California, Berkeley, in 1949. His dissertation is titled A Spectrographic Study of the Night Sky and Aurora in the Near Infrared. In 1944 he married astronomer Marjorie Steele Pettit who became his research partner. They had seven children together.

In 1954, he was awarded the Helen B. Warner Prize for Astronomy by the American Astronomical Society. He was president of the Optical Society of America in 1972 and was awarded the Frederic Ives Medal in 1980. He received the George Van Biesbroeck Prize in 1990.

In 2022 a biography of Meinel and Marjorie was published by Oxford University Press, titled With Stars in Their Eyes: The Extraordinary Lives and Enduring Genius of Aden and Marjorie Meinel.

Telescopes
During his career, Meinel was involved in the design and construction of several large telescopes, including:

 telescope, McDonald Observatory
 and  telescopes, Kitt Peak National Observatory
Relocation of the  telescope, Steward Observatory
 telescope, Steward Observatory
 telescope, Osmania University, Hyderabad, India
 equivalent Multiple Mirror Telescope
 telescope, National Central University, Chung-Li, Taiwan, Republic of China

Publications
Aden Meinel's publications include:

The Near-Infrared Spectrum of the Night Sky and Aurora, Publications of the Astronomical Society of the Pacific, Vol. 60, No. 357, p. 373
On the Spectrum of Lightning in the Venus Atmosphere, Publications of the Astronomical Society of the Pacific, Vol. 74, No. 439, p. 329
Automatic Optical Designing for Astronomy, Publications of the Astronomical Society of the Pacific, Vol. 77, No. 455, p. 136
Catalog of Emission Lines in Astrophysical Objects, Optical Sciences Center Technical Report 27, June 1968, 195 pp.
Power for the People, McDonnell-Douglas Corporation, 1971, 280 pp. *LOC# TJ810.M44
Applied Solar Energy: An Introduction, Addison-Wesley, 1976, 650 pp.
Sunsets, Twilights, and Evenings Skies, Cambridge University Press, 1983, 163 pp. 
Telescope Structures - An Evolutionary Overview, Structural mechanics of optical systems II; Proceedings of the Meeting, Los Angeles, CA, Jan. 13-15, 1987, Society of Photo-Optical Instrumentation Engineers
 Aden  B. Meinel publications

Honors
Founding Director Optical Sciences Center & Professor Emeritus, University of Arizona
SPIE Meinel Commemorative Technical Conference Sept. 22, 2003
Asteroid 4065 Meinel is named in his honor.

See also
Optical Society of America#Past Presidents of the OSA

References

 In Memoriam: Aden B. Meinel, 1922-2011, Optical Society of America
Aden B. Meinel, American Astronomical Association
 Dr. Aden B. Meinel, 1922-2011, National Optical Astronomy Observatory
 
 In Memoriam: Aden Meinel, founder of Kitt Peak National Observatory, SPIE
 Obituary: Aden Baker Meinel, Physics Today 65, 5, 66 (2012)
 Astronomy pioneer Meinel dies at 88, Arizona Star
 The Meinel Partnership and the Founding of the National Observatory
 Aden Meinel's Wartime Experiences: How Luck and Schmidt Plates Changed the Course of History. Optics Luminaries
 Extremely Large Sparse Aperature Telescopes

American astronomers
2011 deaths
1922 births
Presidents of Optica (society)
University of California, Berkeley alumni
University of Arizona faculty